Bern Township is a township in Berks County, Pennsylvania. As of the 2020 census, the population is 6,609. The township is in Schuylkill Valley School District.

History
The township was so named by Swiss settlers after Bern, Switzerland. The Rieser Mill, Rieser-Shoemaker Farm, Spannuth Mill, and Wertz's Covered Bridge are listed on the National Register of Historic Places.

Geography

Adjacent townships
Penn – west
Centre – north
Ontelaunee – northeast
Muhlenberg – east
Spring – south
Lower Heidelberg – southwest

Adjacent city and boroughs
Reading – south
Wyomissing – south
Leesport – north

Demographics

At the 2010 census, there were 6,797 people, 2,080 households, and 1,560 families in the township.  The population density was 355.9 people per square mile (138.7/km2).  There were 2,168 housing units at an average density of 113.5/sq mi (44.2/km2).  The racial makeup of the township was 91.0% White, 5.8% African American, 0.1% Native American, 0.7% Asian, 1.5% from other races, and 1.1% from two or more races. Hispanic or Latino of any race were 9.3% of the population.

There were 2,080 households, 27.6% had children under the age of 18 living with them, 64.3% were married couples living together, 6.5% had a female householder with no husband present, and 24.8% were non-families. 19.1% of households were made up of individuals, and 10.3% were one person aged 65 or older.  The average household size was 2.51 and the average family size was 2.84. Bern Township is the location of the Berks County Prison System, which held 1545 prisoners, 22.7% of the township's population.

The age distribution was 16.0% under the age of 18, 8.8% from 18 to 24, 24.7% from 25 to 44, 29.4% from 45 to 64, and 21.1% 65 or older. The township hosts three of the county's 12 nursing homes for seniors. The median age was 45.3 years. For every 100 females there were 122.2 males.  For every 100 females age 18 and over, there were 120.8 males.

The median household income was $61,222 and the median family income was $68,636. Males had a median income of $46,731 versus $26,694 for females. The per capita income for the township was $25,969.  About 1.2% of families and 2.2% of the population were below the poverty line, including none of those under age 18 and 8.0% of those age 65 or over.

Transportation

U.S. Route 222 is the most prominent highway serving Bern Township. It follows a southwest-northeast alignment across the southeastern part of the township. Pennsylvania Route 183 is the other numbered highway serving the township, following Bernville Road along a northwest-southeast alignment across the southern and western portions of the township.

Reading Regional Airport is located in the southeastern portion of the township.

Recreation
The Youth Recreational Facility and a portion of the Pennsylvania State Game Lands Number 280 are located in the township.

References

External links

Townships in Berks County, Pennsylvania